Bill Crothers Secondary School is an athletic based High school in the community of Unionville in Markham, Ontario, Canada. It was the newest secondary school in the York Region District School Board for a number of years, since 2008. Named for the former Olympic athlete and Chair of the York Region District School Board, Bill Crothers, the school opened its doors to Grade 9 and 10 students in August 2008. The school was formerly an 18-hole golf course, Unionville Golf Centre, opened in 1961.

Notable alumni 

 Bianca Andreescu, tennis player, winner of 2019 US Open
 Trae Bell-Haynes, basketball player
 Joseph Blandisi, ice hockey player
 Anthony Cirelli, ice hockey player
 Travis Dermott, ice hockey player
 Morgan Frost, ice hockey player
 Steven Furlano, soccer player
 Marc Liegghio, Canadian football kicker
 Stephen Maar, volleyball
 Mariah Madigan, retired trampoline gymnast
 Roman Sadovsky, figure skater
 Alain Sargeant, soccer player
 Breanne Wilson-Bennett, ice hockey player
 David Mackie, football player

See also
List of high schools in Ontario

References

External links
Official web site
School Profile at the York Region District School Board
Profile at the Education Quality and Accountability Office (EQAO) web site

York Region District School Board
High schools in the Regional Municipality of York
Educational institutions established in 2008
2008 establishments in Ontario